Samanlui-ye Bozorg (also Romanized as Sāmānlūi-ye Bozorg; also known as Sāmānlū-e Bozorg, or simply as Sāmānlū) is a village in the Sabalan District of Sareyn County, Ardabil Province, Iran. At the 2006 census, its population was 59 in 9 families.

References 

Towns and villages in Sareyn County